Nevow (pronounced like the French nouveau) is a Python web application framework originally developed by the company Divmod.  Template substitution is achieved via a small Tag Attribute Language, which is usually embedded in on-disk XML templates, though there is also a pure-Python domain-specific language called Stan, for expressing this markup programmatically.  Nevow integrates well with Twisted, a framework for event-driven programming.

Nevow had 960 unit tests as of June 2008, and was deployed on several high-profile web sites, most notably the official Python site.

As of mid-2010, Divmod went out of business, causing development work on Nevow to all but cease, and in 2011 its homepage was no longer accessible. There is a project on Launchpad, hosting the source code of Divmod including the source code of the Nevow project.

Athena 
Athena is a Nevow component which facilitates bi-directional, asynchronous communication between the Python and JavaScript portions of a web application in the form of remote procedure calls.  This technique is typically called Ajax or Comet, though Nevow's implementation predates both of these labels.  Athena also includes an inheritance-based JavaScript object system, which forms the basis of a client-side widget abstraction, module system and in-browser unit testing kit.

References 

Scripting languages
Template engines
Free software programmed in Python
Python (programming language) web frameworks
Software using the MIT license